Alder Creek is a stream entirely within Saguache County, Colorado.

Alder Creek was named for the alder trees lining its course.

See also
List of rivers of Colorado

References

Rivers of Saguache County, Colorado
Rivers of Colorado